Citrus assamensis, the adajamir or ginger lime, is a species of flowering plant in the family Rutaceae, native to Assam and Bangladesh. It is locally cultivated for its fruit, which give a very sour juice with an aroma reminiscent of ginger or eucalyptus.

References

assamensis
Flora of Assam (region)
Flora of Bangladesh
Plants described in 1951